
Gmina Sokołów Podlaski is a rural gmina (administrative district) in Sokołów County, Masovian Voivodeship, in east-central Poland. Its seat is the town of Sokołów Podlaski, although the town is not part of the territory of the gmina.

Villages
Gmina Sokołów Podlaski contains the villages and settlements of Bachorza, Bartosz, Brzozów, Brzozów-Kolonia, Budy Kupientyńskie, Chmielew, Czerwonka, Dąbrowa, Dolne Pole, Dziegietnia, Emilianów, Grochów, Justynów, Karlusin, Karolew, Kosierady Wielkie, Kostki, Krasnodęby-Kasmy, Krasnodęby-Rafały, Krasnodęby-Sypytki, Krasów, Łubianki, Nowa Wieś, Podkupientyn, Podrogów, Pogorzel, Przeździatka-Kolonia, Przywózki, Skibniew-Kurcze, Skibniew-Podawce, Walerów, Węże, Wólka Miedzyńska, Wyrąb, Ząbków and Żanecin.

Neighbouring gminas
Gmina Sokołów Podlaski is bordered by the towns of Sokołów Podlaski and Węgrów, and by the gminas of Bielany, Jabłonna Lacka, Kosów Lacki, Liw, Miedzna, Repki, Sabnie, Siedlce and Sterdyń.

References

Polish official population figures 2006

Sokolow Podlaski
Sokołów County